The 2006 Junior Pan American Rhythmic Gymnastics Championships was held in Toronto, Canada, August 27–29, 2006.

Medal summary

References

2006 in gymnastics
Pan American Gymnastics Championships
International gymnastics competitions hosted by Canada
2006 in Canadian sports